Pablo Bartholomew (born 1955) is an Indian photojournalist and an independent photographer based in New Delhi, India. He is noted for his photography, as an educator running photography workshops, and as manager of MediaWeb, a software company specialising in photo database solutions and server-based digital archiving systems.

He was awarded the Padma Shri by the Government of India in 2013. In 2014, he received the Ordre des Arts et des Lettres.

Early life and education
The older of two siblings, Bartholomew was born on 18 December 1955 in New Delhi, India. His father, Richard Bartholomew (1926–1985) was a Burmese refugee who settled in the Indian capital and who came to be one of the country's leading art critics, as well as a painter, poet, and photographer. His mother, Rati Batra, a Partition refugee, was a well-known theatre activist and one of the founding members of Yatrik, a theatre company established in 1964.

Bartholomew studied at Modern School, where his father taught English. He abandoned his schooling in Class Nine, adopting the camera instead. In his early teens he photographed his family, friends, people, and cities. He participated in the city’s emerging theatre scene and even produced, in the ’70s, a series of events called “Thru Pablo’s Eyes” which was based on rock music accompanied with slide and film projection and live performers. To make ends meet, and to finance his photo documentary projects, he worked in advertising and as a stills photographer, most notably on the sets of Satyajit Ray's Shatranj ke Khilari (1977) and Richard Attenborough's 1982-film, Gandhi. In 1975, he was awarded First Prize by World Press Photo for his series "Time is the mercy of eternity," on morphine addicts in India titled Time is the Mercy of Eternity.

Photojournalism
From 1984 until 2000, Bartholomew was represented by the French-American news photo agency, Gamma Liaison  during which time he primarily covered conflicts and developments in the South Asian region. His photographs were published in New York Times, Newsweek, Time, Business Week, National Geographic, GEO, Der Spiegel, Figaro, Paris Match, The Telegraph, The Sunday Times Magazine, The Guardian, and Observer Magazine, among others.

He covered the Bhopal disaster, the funeral of Indira Gandhi and aftermath of her assassination—the Hindu-Sikh riots, the rise of the Khalistani movement, the political career of Rajiv Gandhi, the funeral of Mother Teresa, the cyclones in Bangladesh, the Nellie conflict in Assam, and the demolition of the Babri Masjid, which almost got him killed; among many other news stories. 
 
He was awarded the World Press Photo of the Year in 1985 for his now iconic image of a half-buried child victim of the Bhopal disaster.

Photography career
Bartholomew had his first photography lessons at home, in his father’s darkroom. “When we went to our summerhouse, I would be with him in the darkroom, looking at the images emerging in the developing tray. That was pure magic. He didn’t teach me anything specific about photography. What I took from him was the need to be a more sophisticated man—a Renaissance man, like him—whom I’m not,” said Bartholomew in an interview with photography website, Invisible Photographer Asia. During his teenage years, he started photographing his family and friends and life on the streets, including the worlds of the marginalised rag pickers, sex workers, beggars, and eunuchs. He first exhibited photographs from this body of work at Art Heritage Gallery, New Delhi, in 1979, and at the Jehangir Art Gallery, Bombay, in 1980. In July 2007, Outside In: A Tale of Three Cities, a retrospective revisiting of the same archive of photographs from his teenage diary, shot in Bombay, Delhi, and Calcutta, was shown at Rencontres d’Arles. In 2008, the show travelled to the National Museum, New Delhi, the National Gallery of Modern Art, Mumbai, Bodhi Art, New York, and in 2009, to Bodhi Berlin. The display of the series at Chobimela VII in Dhaka in January 2013 marked its 12th showing.

He has held a number of fellowships, including one from the Asian Cultural Council, New York (1987), to photograph Indian immigrants in the USA, and one from the Institute of Comparative Studies in Human Culture, Norway (1995), to photograph the Naga tribes in India. Between 2001 and 2003 he ran a photography workshop for emerging photographers in India with the support of the World Press Photo Foundation in Amsterdam. Among his photo essays are "The Chinese in Calcutta," "The Indians in America," and "The Naga Tribes of Northeast India".

Awards

 World Press Photo award for his series on morphine addicts in India (1975)
 World Press Photo of the Year (1985) for the Bhopal Gas Tragedy, where he shot an iconic picture of a little girl being buried.
 Padma Shri Award 2014
 Ordre des Arts et des Lettres, 2014

Photo Exhibitions and shows 

Bartholomew's earliest solo exhibitions, in New Delhi in 1980 and Bombay in 1981, dealt with the marginal worlds he inhabited at that time. In 2005 he exhibited at Month of Photography in Tokyo. In 2007 he exhibited at the Rencontres d’Arles photography festival in France, and Newark Museum's Indian Photography and Video Festival.

References

External links
 
 Netphotograph, Online archive of photos
 Teenage Work "OUTSIDE IN, 70s & 80s, A tale of 3 cities"
 The Indian Emigre project
 World Press Photo winner 1976 Morphine addicts series
 Bhopal Gas Tragedy 1984
 Mother Teresa – A photo tribute
 Nagas-Marked with beauty
 The Haidas on National Geographic
 Digital Camera interview
 Related exhibition site of Richard Bartholomew
 Listing of awards on the World Press Photo Website

Asian Cultural Council grantees
1955 births
Living people
Indian photojournalists
Recipients of the Padma Shri in arts
People from New Delhi
Indian people of Burmese descent
20th-century Indian photographers
Chevaliers of the Ordre des Arts et des Lettres
Indian male journalists
20th-century Indian journalists
Photographers from Delhi
Bhopal disaster